The Auburn University Historic District comprises the historic core of Auburn University in Alabama. The  district includes buildings built between 1846 and 1951, with a consistent red brick material palette.

Buildings in the district include Samford Hall (1888), The Lathe (1860s), Langdon Hall (1846), the Music Building (1887-1888), Broun Engineering Hall (1906-1910), Mary E. Martin Hall (1908), the Music Annex or Power Plant (1905), the early 20th-century Langdon Shops, and Biggin Hall (1951).

The Auburn University Historic District was listed on the National Register of Historic Places on June 3, 1976.

References

Historic districts on the National Register of Historic Places in Alabama
Lee County, Alabama
Auburn University
National Register of Historic Places in Lee County, Alabama